William Lubtchansky (26 October 1937 – 4 May 2010) was a French cinematographer.

Biography 
Lubtchansky's first film was Agnès Varda's 1965 short, Elsa la Rose. He shot over 100 films, including several for Jean-Luc Godard, Jacques Rivette, Jean Marie Straub and Danièle Huillet and Nadine Trintignant. He has also worked with Philippe Garrel, François Truffaut, Marcel Camus and Peter Brook (for the 1989 6-hour version of The Mahabharata). Lubtchansky died in Paris, France, on 4 May 2010 from heart disease.

Selected filmography 
 Time to Live (1969)
 It Only Happens to Others (1971)
 Violins at the Ball (1974)
 Speak to Me of Love (1975)
 Noroît (1976)
 Here and Elsewhere (1976)
 Duelle (1976)
 The Woman Next Door (1981)
 Neige (1981)
 Le Pont du Nord (1981)
 Cap Canaille (1983)
 Love on the Ground (1984)
 Class Relations (1984)
 After Darkness (1985)
 I Love You (1986)
 Agent trouble (1987)
 Black Sin (1989)
 The Mahabharata (1989)
 The Little Gangster (1990)
 La Belle Noiseuse (1991)
 La Chasse aux papillons (1992)
 Le Nouveau monde (1995)
 Tell Me I'm Dreaming (1998)
 Top Secret (1998)
 Sicilia! (1999)
 Farewell, Home Sweet Home (1999)
 Va savoir (2001)
 The Story of Marie and Julien (2003)
 Regular Lovers (2005)
 The Duchess of Langeais (2007)
 Frontier of the Dawn (2008)

References

External links 
 

1937 births
2010 deaths
French cinematographers

French people of Polish-Jewish descent